The 2019 Balearic regional election was held on Sunday, 26 May 2019, to elect the 10th Parliament of the autonomous community of the Balearic Islands. All 59 seats in the Parliament were up for election. The election was held simultaneously with regional elections in eleven other autonomous communities and local elections all throughout Spain, as well as the 2019 European Parliament election.

Overview

Electoral system
The Parliament of the Balearic Islands was the devolved, unicameral legislature of the autonomous community of the Balearic Islands, having legislative power in regional matters as defined by the Spanish Constitution and the Balearic Statute of Autonomy, as well as the ability to vote confidence in or withdraw it from a regional president.

Voting for the Parliament was on the basis of universal suffrage, which comprised all nationals over 18 years of age, registered in the Balearic Islands and in full enjoyment of their political rights. Additionally, Balearic people abroad were required to apply for voting before being permitted to vote, a system known as "begged" or expat vote. The 59 members of the Parliament of the Balearic Islands were elected using the D'Hondt method and a closed list proportional representation, with an electoral threshold of five percent of valid votes—which included blank ballots—being applied in each constituency. Seats were allocated to constituencies, corresponding to the islands of Mallorca, Menorca, Ibiza and Formentera, with each being allocated a fixed number of seats: 33 for Mallorca, 13 for Menorca, 12 for Ibiza and 1 for Formentera.

Election date
The term of the Parliament of the Balearic Islands expired four years after the date of its previous election, unless it was dissolved earlier. The election decree was required to be issued no later than the twenty-fifth day prior to the date of expiry of parliament and published on the following day in the Official Gazette of the Balearic Islands (BOIB), with election day taking place on the fifty-fourth day from publication. The previous election was held on 24 May 2015, which meant that the legislature's term would have expired on 24 May 2019. The election decree was required to be published in the BOIB no later than 30 April 2019, with the election taking place on the fifty-fourth day from publication, setting the latest possible election date for the Parliament on Sunday, 23 June 2019.

The president had the prerogative to dissolve the Parliament of the Balearic Islands and call a snap election, provided that no motion of no confidence was in process and that dissolution did not occur before one year had elapsed since the previous one. In the event of an investiture process failing to elect a regional president within a sixty-day period from the first ballot, the Parliament was to be automatically dissolved and a fresh election called.

Background
The previous election saw a left-wing majority in the Parliament of the Balearic Islands for the first time. After the election, on 30 June 2015, Francina Armengol was elected president, forming a government with the Socialist Party of the Balearic Islands (PSIB), More for Mallorca (Més) and More for Menorca (MpM), with the external support of We Can (Podemos) and the representative of People for Formentera (GxF). Xelo Huertas, of Podem, took office as the Parliament's speaker, the second authority of the region.

In November 2016, Podemos decided to cease two party deputies, including Huertas, for trying to benefit another party member's personal interests. On 25 January 2017, Huertas resigned as Speaker, although she continued in the Mixed Group as an independent deputy, along with Montse Seijas, the other expelled Podemos deputy. The parties of the pact, with some disputes, agreed to vote for Podemos deputy Baltasar Picornell to become new Speaker on 14 February 2017.

In March 2017, a fraudulent contract to the campaign manager of Més made by the regional vice president, Gabriel Barceló, appeared in the media. This fact created a crisis in the Government and ended up with the resignation of transparency minister Ruth Mateu and the withdrawal of her party, MpM, from the government, although remaining as an outer supporter.

In June 2017, the People's Party (PP) member Álvaro Gijón resigned from the party but continued as a deputy in the Mixed Group. The cause was a fraudulent contract for a municipal company in Palma made by the time Gijón was deputy mayor, also involving part of his family.

In December 2017, Barceló was accused of accepting a personal travel as a gift. This fact, along with controversies and internal disputes since March, made him resign as regional vice president and tourism minister. Barceló was relieved by Bel Busquets, of Més.

Parliamentary composition
The Parliament of the Balearic Islands was officially dissolved on 2 April 2019, after the publication of the dissolution decree in the Official Gazette of the Balearic Islands. The table below shows the composition of the parliamentary groups in the Parliament at the time of dissolution.

Parties and candidates
The electoral law allowed for parties and federations registered in the interior ministry, coalitions and groupings of electors to present lists of candidates. Parties and federations intending to form a coalition ahead of an election were required to inform the relevant Electoral Commission within ten days of the election call, whereas groupings of electors needed to secure the signature of at least one percent of the electorate in the constituencies for which they sought election, disallowing electors from signing for more than one list of candidates.

Below is a list of the main parties and electoral alliances which contested the election:

The main opposition party, the People's Party (PP), held its regional congress in March 2017, electing Biel Company as new party leader over former regional president José Ramón Bauzà, who had resigned as the PP leader after the 2015 election. On 23 January 2019, Bauzà announced his withdrawal as PP member, resigning from his senator post, accusing his former party of "sowing and watering a [Catalan] nationalism" allegedly "exploited" by left-wing parties. It was later revealed that Bauzà would be running for Citizens (Cs) in the 2019 European Parliament election.

In May 2017, More for Minorca (MpM) was transformed into a party, electing 2015 candidate Nel Martí as its coordinator. In December 2018, Josep Castells was elected as its 2019 candidate. In June 2018, president of the Island Council of Mallorca Miquel Ensenyat won the More for Mallorca (Més) primaries to become its candidate.

In November 2018, We Can (Podemos) chose that its candidate would be Juan Pedro Yllanes, who was member of the Congress of Deputies at the time. In March 2019, Cs held its primaries, having Marc Pérez-Ribas winning over the regional leader and 2015 candidate Xavier Pericay.

Campaign

Party slogans

Election debates

Opinion polls

Opinion polls
The table below lists voting intention estimates in reverse chronological order, showing the most recent first and using the dates when the survey fieldwork was done, as opposed to the date of publication. Where the fieldwork dates are unknown, the date of publication is given instead. The highest percentage figure in each polling survey is displayed with its background shaded in the leading party's colour. If a tie ensues, this is applied to the figures with the highest percentages. The "Lead" column on the right shows the percentage-point difference between the parties with the highest percentages in a poll. When available, seat projections determined by the polling organisations are displayed below (or in place of) the percentages in a smaller font; 30 seats were required for an absolute majority in the Parliament of the Balearic Islands.

Results

Overall

Distribution by constituency

Aftermath

Notes

References
Opinion poll sources

Other

Balearic Islands
Regional elections in the Balearic Islands